Scissor Sisters is the debut studio album by American glam rock band Scissor Sisters, first released on February 2, 2004. It was released by Polydor Records in the United Kingdom and Universal Motown Records in the United States.

Scissor Sisters reached number 1 on the UK and Irish albums charts and was the best-selling album of 2004 in the UK. Since its release, it been certified 9× Platinum in the UK, selling over 2,700,000 copies in the country alone. In Ireland, it has been certified 5× Platinum. The album was not as successful in their native US, peaking at number 102 on the Billboard 200. As of February 2007, it has sold 299,000 copies in United States. Scissor Sisters has sold 3,300,000 copies worldwide, and is listed as one of 1001 Albums You Must Hear Before You Die in the book of the same name, edited by Robert Dimery.

The album won Best International Album at the 2005 BRIT Awards. In July 2006 it was named by Attitude as the top "gay album" of all time.

Critical reception

At Metacritic, which assigns a normalized rating out of 100 to reviews from mainstream critics, the album received an average score of 81, which indicates "universal acclaim".

Track listing

Personnel
 Jake Shears – lead vocals, piano on "Laura"
 Babydaddy – bass guitar, keyboards, guitar, backing vocals
 Ana Lynch – lead vocals
 Del Marquis – guitar, bass guitar
 Paddy Boom – drums, percussion

Charts

Weekly charts

Year-end charts

Decade-end charts

Certifications

Release history

References

Scissor Sisters albums
2004 debut albums
Brit Award for International Album
LGBT-related albums
Polydor Records albums
Universal Records albums